Lemnia is a commune in Covasna County, Transylvania, Romania. The commune is composed of a single village, Lemnia. It also included two other villages until 2004, when they were split off to form Mereni Commune.

It formed part of the Székely Land region of the historical Transylvania province. Until 1918, the village belonged to the Háromszék County of the Kingdom of Hungary. After the Treaty of Trianon of 1920, it became part of Romania.

Demographics

The commune has an absolute Székely Hungarian majority. According to the 2002 Census it has a population of 3,454 of which 98.49% or 3,402 are Hungarian.

References

Communes in Covasna County
Localities in Transylvania